NGC 6055 is a barred lenticular galaxy located about 450 million light-years away in the constellation Hercules. The galaxy was discovered by astronomer Lewis Swift on June 8, 1886. It also a member of the Hercules Cluster and is a LINER galaxy.

See also
 List of NGC objects (6001–7000)

References

External links

6055
57076
Hercules (constellation)
Hercules Cluster
Astronomical objects discovered in 1886
Barred lenticular galaxies
LINER galaxies
10191